This is an alphabetical list of villages in Nellore district, a district in Andhra Pradesh, India.

A 

 Ananthasagaram
 Anumasamudrampeta
 Apparao Palem

B 

 Balayapalle
 Basinenipalli
 Bheemavarappadu
 Bitragunta
 Bogole
 Botikarlapadu

C 

 Chaganam Rajupalem
 Cheerla Vari Kandrika
 Chejerla
 Chennavarappadu
 Chennur
 Chillakur
 Chintalapalem
 Chittamur

D 

 D. Velampalli
 Dagadarthi
 Daggavolu
 Dakkili
 Damaramadugu
 Damegunta
 Dharmavaram
 Doravarisatram
 Duggunta
 Duttalur

G-J 

 Gandipalem
 Indukurupeta
 Jaladanki
 Jonnawada

K 

 Kaligiri
 Kaluvoya
 Kammapalli
 Kammavaari palem
 Kammavari palli
 Kodavalur
 Kodivaka
 Kokkupalem
 Komatigunta Rajupalem
 Konagaluru
 Kondapuram
 Koneti Raju Palem
 Kota
 Kothapalli

M 

 Madamanuru
 Mangalampadu
 Manubolu
 Marlagunta
 Marripadu
 Menakuru
 Mittatmakur
 Mudivarthi
 Muthukur
 Mypadu

N-O 

 N. Kothapalli
 Narrawada
 Nelapattu
 Nellatur
 North Rajupalem
 Ojili

P 

 Pangili
 Pellakur
 Penchalakona
 Pennepalli
 Pepala vari palem
 Periyavaram
 Podalakur
 Puttamraju Kandriga

R 

 Rama Reddy Palem
 Ramanapalem
 Ramapuram
 Rebala

S 

 Saipeta
 Sangam
 Sarvepalli
 Seetharamapuram
 Shar Project
 Siddana konduru
 Siddareddy Palem
 Sydapuram

T 

 Tada
 Thinnelapudi
 Thippavarappadu
 Thirumalamma Palem
 Thoorpu Dubagunta
 Thotapalligudur
 Thummalapenta

U 

 Ulavapalli
 Utukur
 Upputuru

V 

 Vakadu
 Varikuntapadu
 Veguru
 Venadu
 Vendodu
 Vidavalur
 Vinjamur
 Viruvur

Y 

 Yellayapalem

Nellore villages
 
Nellore